Milk Money may refer to:

Milk Money (film), a 1994 romantic comedy film
Milk Money (anime), a 2004 hentai series
Milk Money (band), an American band